Unterman is a surname. Notable people with the surname include:

 Isser Yehuda Unterman (1886–1976), Ashkenazi Chief Rabbi of Israel
 Renee Unterman (born 1954), American politician
 Reva Unterman, British writer

See also 

 Untermann

Jewish surnames
Surnames of Israeli origin